Helianthus membranifolius is a species of sunflower in the family Asteraceae. It is native to Cayenne Island in French Guiana, part of the French Republic.

References
'

membranifolius
Flora of French Guiana
Plants described in 1813